"On My Mind" is a single from Australian singer Cody Simpson. The song was written by Nasri, Julie Frost, Fraser T Smith, and Mike Caren. It was heavily sampled from the 1986 song, "Your Love", by The Outfield. It was released in iTunes on 23 May 2011.

Background
"On My Mind" was released in iTunes on 23 May 2011.

Composition
The song is composed in a key of E major and sampled from a 1986 song, "Your Love", by The Outfield.

Performances
Simpson performed "On My Mind" on CBS's The Early Show on 4 June 2011. Simpson also performed the song on Justin Bieber's "Believe Tour"

Music video
Simpson's video was released on 17 June 2011. The video was directed by Travis Kopach and featured dancer/actress Hailey Baldwin, wife of Justin Bieber. The video is based on Simpson finding a picture of a girl (Hailey) in the mall and searching the mall for her. Towards the end, he plays a video throughout the mall asking that girl to meet him at a theater. In the last scene, you see the girl come up behind him at the theater, take a picture of him, and walk into the theater together, both of their photos next to each other on the ground.

Track listing
Digital download
 "On My Mind" – 3:11
 "On My Mind" (Karsten Delgado & Mani Myles Mix) – 3:26
 "On My Mind" (official karaoke version) – 3:09

Chart performance
On the week ending 27 August 2011, "On My Mind" debuted at number 39 on the US Pop Songs chart.

Charts

References

2011 singles
2011 songs
Cody Simpson songs
Songs written by Julie Frost
Songs written by Fraser T. Smith
Song recordings produced by Fraser T. Smith
Songs written by Nasri (musician)
Songs written by Mike Caren